Aceburic acid (INN), also known as 4-acetoxybutanoic acid or 4-hydroxybutyric acid acetate, is drug described as an analgesic which was never marketed. It is the acetyl ester of gamma-hydroxybutyrate (GHB, which is 4-hydroxybutanoic acid), and based on its structural relation to GHB, is likely to behave as a prodrug to it.

See also
 1,4-Butanediol (1,4-BD)
 1,6-Dioxecane-2,7-dione
 γ-Butyrolactone (GBL)
 γ-Hydroxybutyraldehyde (GHBAL)
 γ-Valerolactone (GVL)
 Aceturic acid
 Aceglutamide
 Ethyl acetoxy butanoate

References

Acetate esters
Analgesics
Carboxylic acids
GABAB receptor agonists
GHB receptor agonists
Prodrugs
Sedatives